Robert Hale Shadley (born April 7, 1926), is a politician in the American state of Florida. He served in the Florida House of Representatives from 1967 to 1968, representing the 40th district.

References

1926 births
Possibly living people
Members of the Florida House of Representatives